Maximiliano Hernán Paredes (born 26 March 1991) is an Argentine professional footballer who plays as a right-back for Sol de Mayo.

Career
Paredes' career began with Chacarita Juniors. He made his professional debut in the Argentine Primera División on 23 April 2010 against Godoy Cruz, with further appearances coming in the following month over Vélez Sarsfield and Racing Club in a season which ended with relegation to the 2010–11 Primera B Nacional. In the following six campaigns, Paredes participated in one hundred and twenty-eight league fixtures for the club. On 10 January 2016, Paredes departed the second tier team to join Primera División side Quilmes on loan. Four appearances followed in 2016 as they came second-bottom in Zone 1.

He returned to Chacarita Juniors for the 2016–17 Primera B Nacional, appearing twenty-four times in all competitions as they won promotion to the top-flight. August 2017 saw Paredes leave on loan again, signing for Primera B Nacional's Deportivo Morón. His first goal for them arrived in the following March in an away win versus All Boys. He remained for two seasons, making forty-two appearances. A third loan away from Chacarita was completed in July 2019, as the defender agreed terms with fellow Primera B Nacional team Atlético de Rafaela. A debut soon occurred against Brown in August.

Paredes completed a permanent move to Torneo Federal A's Sarmiento in August 2020. In February 2021, Peredes joined Torneo Argentino A club Club Sol de Mayo.

Career statistics
.

References

External links

1991 births
Living people
People from Hurlingham Partido
Argentine footballers
Association football defenders
Argentine Primera División players
Primera Nacional players
Primera B Metropolitana players
Torneo Argentino A players
Chacarita Juniors footballers
Quilmes Atlético Club footballers
Deportivo Morón footballers
Atlético de Rafaela footballers
Sarmiento de Resistencia footballers
Sportspeople from Buenos Aires Province